Venice Township may refer to:

 Venice Township, Madison County, Illinois
 Venice Township, Shiawassee County, Michigan
 Venice Township, Seneca County, Ohio

See also

Venice (disambiguation)

Township name disambiguation pages